The 2005–06 season was the 62nd season in the existence of Lille OSC and the club's 6th consecutive season in the top flight of French football. In addition to the domestic league, Lille participated in this season's edition of the Coupe de France, the Coupe de la Ligue, the UEFA Champions League, and the UEFA Cup. The season covered the period from 1 July 2005 to 30 June 2006.

Transfers

In

Out

Competitions

Overall record

Ligue 1

League table

Results summary

Results by round

Matches

Coupe de France

Coupe de la Ligue

UEFA Champions League

Group stage

UEFA Cup

Round of 32

Round of 16

Statistics

Goalscorers

References

Lille OSC seasons
Lille